In Iceland, a grade point average (GPA) is given as a weighed average of all grades in a marked period. Grades range from 0–10, where 10 is the highest, and the GPA is rounded off to two decimal points.

Term- and course grades are given on the scale of 0-10 with increments of 0.5.

For added convenience, grades are categorized as follows:

References

Iceland
Education in Iceland
Grading